This is the discography of Canadian singer-songwriter Alannah Myles.

Albums

Studio albums

Compilation albums

EPs

Singles

Guest appearances
 "Give Peace a Chance" (1991 charity single as part of Peace Choir)
 "Don't Give Up" (duet with Saga, released as a B-side to the latter's 2001 single "Money Talks")
 "Try to Live Again" and "I'll Remember You" (both duets with Joe Lynn Turner, from the 2001 Nikolo Kotzev rock opera Nostradamus.
 "I Can't Stand the Rain" (with Jeff Healey, from the 2006 album MTM Music – 10th Anniversary)
 "Back & Forth" (backing vocals, from Tiles' 2008 album Fly Paper)
 "We Got It All" (duet with Kee Marcello, from the latter's 2011 Redux: Melon Demon Divine)

References

Discographies of Canadian artists
Rock music discographies
Pop music discographies